Arlington School District 47 is a public school district based in Maricopa County, Arizona. It feeds into Buckeye Union High School District.

External links
 

School districts in Maricopa County, Arizona